Institute of Finance may refer to:

 Amsterdam Institute of Finance
 Asian Institute of Finance
 China Institute of Finance
 Institute of International Finance
 New York Institute of Finance